Unbreakable is the debut studio album by American Christian metalcore band MyChildren MyBride. The album was produced by Joey Sturgis and mixed by Adam Dutkiewicz (Killswitch Engage). It was released on February 26, 2008 through Solid State Records.

Track listing
 "Faithless" - 3:50
 "On Wings of Integrity" - 2:41
 "The Machinist" - 4:04
 "Headshot!" - 3:30
 "Boris the Blade" - 4:31
 "Severance" - 4:22
 "Versus" - 2:41
 "Waves of Oppression" - 4:09
 "Circle the Sky" - 4:26
 "Choke" - 4:22

Personnel
MyChildren MyBride 
 Matthew Hasting – lead vocals
 Kyle Ray - lead guitar, backing vocals
 Robert Bloomfield - rhythm guitar, backing vocals
 Joe Lengson - bass, backing vocals
 Brian Hood - drums, percussion, backing vocals

 Additional 
 Chad Ruhlig - guest vocals on "Headshot!" 

Production
 Joey Sturgis - production, engineering, programming
 Adam Dutkiewicz - mixing 
 Troy Glessner - mastering

References

Solid State Records albums
2008 debut albums
MyChildren MyBride albums
Albums produced by Joey Sturgis